Alpes-Maritimes ("Maritime Alps") is a department of France located in the country's southeast corner, on the Italian border and Mediterranean coast. Part of the Provence-Alpes-Côte d'Azur region, it encompasses the French Riviera alongside neighbouring Var. Alpes-Maritimes had a population of 1,094,283 in 2019. Its prefecture (and largest city) is Nice, with Grasse as the sole subprefecture.

Alpes-Maritimes has become one of the world's most attractive tourist destinations in recent years, featuring renowned cities and towns such as Nice, Grasse, Cannes, Antibes, Menton, Èze, Roquebrune-Cap-Martin and Sainte-Agnès, as well as numerous alpine ski resorts. It also entirely surrounds the Principality of Monaco. The department's inhabitants are called Maralpins (masculine) or Maralpines (feminine); its flag and arms are those of the City of Nice. In terms of politics, Alpes-Maritimes is one of France's most right-wing departments, as the majority led by The Republicans in the departmental council holds all but two of the 54 seats following the 2021 election.

Geography

Overview 
The Alpes-Maritimes department is surrounded by the departments of Var in the southwest, Alpes-de-Haute-Provence in the northwest; Italy to the north and east; and the Mediterranean Sea to the south. It surrounds the Principality of Monaco on the west, north and east.

Its topography is very mixed. As its name suggests, most of the department is a constituent part of the overall topographic Alps – including the Maritime Alps – but it also has the distinction of being a coastal district with its Mediterranean coast. The coastal area, urbanized and densely populated (shaded in red on the map), includes all the cities in an almost continuous conurbation from Cannes to Menton, while the larger but sparsely populated mountainous area (light green) is fully rural with the exception of the three large resorts of Valberg (created in 1936), Auron (created in 1937) and Isola 2000 (created in 1971).

Summits and passes 
The highest point of the department is the Cime du Gélas on the Franco-Italian border which dominates the Vallée des Merveilles further east. Except in winter, four passes allow passage to the north of the Mercantour/Argentera mountain range whose imposing  barrier is covered in winter snow which is visible from the coast. From the west, the Route des Grandes Alpes enters the Cayolle Pass first on the way to the Alps and the sources of the Var in the commune of Entraunes. Then the route follows the Col de la Bonette – the highest pass in Europe at  – to connect to the valley of the Tinée then the Ubaye. Further east, the Col de la Lombarde above Isola 2000 allows access to the shrine of Saint-Anne de Vinadio in Italy. Finally, at its eastern end, the Col de Tende links with Cuneo in Italy.

Landscape and forest vegetation 
The only region of the Alps close to Nice has an afforestation rate of 60.9%, slightly higher than the average of the department and well above the average of 39.4% for the Provence-Alpes-Côte d'Azur region.

The rivers in alphabetical order are:

 Aigue Blanche
 Barlatte
 Bassera
 Bendola
 Bévéra
 Borrigo
 Bourdous
 Bouyon
 Brague
 Braisse
 Braus
 Cagne
 Caramagne
 Carei
 Castérine
 Chalvagne
 Cians
 Cianavelle
 Clans
 Coulomb
 Estéron
 Faye
 Fontanalba
 Gorbio
 Gordolasque
 Guercha
 Lévensa or Levenza
 Loup
 Lubiane
 Maglia
 Magnan
 Malvan
 Mayola
 Minière
 Nieya
 Oglione
 Paillon (les Paillons)
 Raton
 Réfréi
 Riou
 Rioulan
 Roudoule
 Roya
 Siagne
 Tinée
 Tuébi
 Valmasque
 Var
 Vésubie
 Vionène

Climate 

It is the climate that made the Côte d'Azur famous. The current department of Alpes-Maritimes, however, does not have only one climate, the complex terrain and high mountains divide the department between those who are well exposed (the south-facing side) and those which are less (the north-facing side) and even with the mild Mediterranean climate there can be violent storms and prolonged droughts.

The coastal area has a Mediterranean climate (rainfall in autumn and spring especially, summer drought, mild winter and dry). The interior, especially in the north, has a mountain climate (winter quite bright, summer storms). Around Cannes is a particularly warm micro-climate due to the high hills warming the air which descends on the city.

One of the attractions of the department is its level of sunshine: 300 days per year. Despite this the department is also the most stormy of France with an average of 70 to 110 thunderstorm days per year, arising from the differences in temperature due to a warm sea in autumn.

As soon as one moves away from the coast, towards the west of the department, the interior plains (in particular near Grasse) the climate is a little less temperate but just as sunny. In summer, the temperature very easily exceeds , while the average is only  on the Nice coast for July and August. Occasional frost is possible in the interior during winter when, unlike in Nice and rest of the coast, where they are very rare.

In the east of the department, unlike the west, there are no plains. In the Menton region, the altitude increases very rapidly inland, so the sea tempers the atmosphere much more: the maximum in summer is on average  and the winters are milder than in the interior Frost is rare.

Snow is rare on the coast, however, it happens that good falls surprise the Côte d'Azur, as was the case in the winter of 2004–2005 when the city of Nice woke up with a few centimetres of snow, creating traffic problems.

In the north of the department the climate in the Alps is mountainous, and there is snow from November to May.

Subdivisions 

Alpes-Maritimes is divided into two arrondissements: Grasse and Nice, twenty-seven cantons and 163 communes.

As of 1 January 2014, there were seven intercommunalities:
 Four agglomeration communities:
 Communauté d'agglomération de Sophia Antipolis
 Communauté d'agglomération Cannes Pays de Lérins
 Communauté d'agglomération du Pays de Grasse
 Communauté d'agglomération de la Riviera Française
 One metropolis:
 Métropole Nice Côte d'Azur.
 Two communautés de communes:
 
 

 Principal communes 

The most populous commune is the prefecture Nice. As of 2019, there are 10 communes with more than 20,000 inhabitants:

 History 

The Roman military district of Alpes Maritimae was created by Augustus in 14 BC. It became a full Roman province in the middle of the 1st century AD, with its capital first at Cemenelum (today Cimiez, a suburb north of Nice) and subsequently at Embrun. At its greatest extent in AD 297, the province reached north to Digne and Briançon.

Conquered by the French First Republic during the French Revolutionary Wars, a department of Alpes-Maritimes was first set up in 1793 with different boundaries from those of the modern department. In 1793, Alpes-Maritimes included Monaco (Port Hercules), but not Grasse, which was then part of the department of Var as an historical part of France. In 1805, San Remo (San Rème) was included after the disbandment of the Ligurian Republic. In 1812, the department had three arrondissements with the following cantons:
 Nice, cantons: Nice (2 cantons), Aspremont, La Brigue, Menton, Monaco, Roquebillière, Saint-Sauveur-sur-Tinée, Saorge, L'Escarène, Sospel, Utelle and Villefranche-sur-Mer.
 Sanremo, cantons: Sanremo, Bordighera, Dolceacqua, Pigna, Taggia, Triora and Ventimiglia.
 Puget-Théniers, cantons: Puget-Théniers, Beuil, Gilette, Guillaumes, Roquestéron, Saint-Étienne-de-Tinée and Villars-sur-Var.

In 1814, at the close of the Napoleonic Wars, the territory was restored to the Crown of Savoy by the Congress of Vienna.

In 1860 Camillo Benso, Count of Cavour, one of the architects of Italian unity with the Kingdom of Piedmont-Sardinia, negotiated support for Napoleon III in exchange for Savoy and the County of Nice as set forth in the Treaty of Turin. The annexation was confirmed on 15 and 16 April 1860 by 30,712 male electors enrolled in the 89 communes of the County of Nice who, for the first time, had universal male suffrage by plebiscite. The "Yes" vote for reunification with France was 83.8% of registered voters and 99.2% of votes.

The new department of Alpes-Maritimes consisted of the former County of Nice, divided into an Arrondissement of Nice and an Arrondissement of Puget-Théniers (both arrondissements existed in the former Department (1793–1814)), and a portion of the Var department, which formed the Arrondissement of Grasse. However, the County of Nice did not include Tende and La Brigue, which were still part of Piedmont-Sardinia.

For economic reasons, the Arrondissement of Puget-Théniers was merged into the Arrondissement of Nice in 1926.  Since that time, the department has had two arrondissements.

In 1947, in accordance with the Treaty of Paris and as a referendum result favourable to their attachment to France, the communes of Tende and La Brigue (also parts of communes in the high valleys of Vésubie and Tinée: part the commune of Isola) which had not been ceded to France in 1860, were attached to the department.

 Heraldry 

 Administration 
 Politics 

Since the end of World War II, Alpes-Maritimes has generally voted to the right. It has nine constituencies for the National Assembly. Following the 2017 legislative election, six constituencies are represented by members of The Republicans (LR) right-wing party and three by members of the La République En Marche! (REM) centrist party. Of the five members of the Senate who represent the department in the upper house of Parliament, four are right-wing (LR) and one is left-wing (Socialist Party, PS). Of the 54 departmental councillors, 52 are aligned with the right-wing coalition and two are in the left-wing opposition.

In the 2022 French presidential election, Marine Le Pen of the National Rally won a majority in Alpes-Maritimes in the first round; incumbent Emmanuel Macron of La République En Marche! won a majority in the second round.

In the 1980s and 1990s, Alpes-Maritimes experienced corruption problems with its politicians, which led to several criminal convictions, including those of Nice Mayor Jacques Médecin and Cannes Mayor Michel Mouillot, as well as that of Antibes Mayor Pierre Merli, criminally indicted in 1995 for a real estate scam and convicted four years later.

 Departmental Council of Alpes-Maritimes 

The President of the Departmental Council has been Charles-Ange Ginésy since 2017, who took office upon succeeding Éric Ciotti. Ciotti remained a councillor and became majority leader. Ginésy, who has been a councillor for the canton of Vence since 2015, has held a seat in the council since 2003. He also was Mayor of Péone (2001–2017) and the MP for Alpes-Maritimes's 2nd constituency (2005–2007; 2007–2008; 2009–2010; 2012–2017). Both are members of The Republicans (LR).

The coalition majority in the departmental council is one of the largest majorities in any such institution in France. Out of the 54 seats, only two are held by left-wing councillors, both elected in the canton of Grasse-2. In neighbouring Var, the right-wing coalition also holds all but two seats in the departmental council, although it is made up of less many seats and the two councillors in opposition are members of the far-right National Rally (RN). Following the 2021 departmental election, the seats were allocated as follows in Alpes-Maritimes:

 Representation in Parliament 
 Members of the National Assembly 
Alpes-Maritimes elected the following MPs to the National Assembly in the 2022 legislative election:

 Senators 

As of 2020, the department's five Senators are Marc Daunis (PS, since 2008), Colette Giudicelli (LR, since 2008), Jean-Pierre Leleux (LR, since 2008), Dominique Estrosi Sassone (LR, since 2014) and Henri Leroy (LR, since 2017).

 Budget 
In 2011, the draft departmental budget amounted to €1.3 billion of which 498 million (38.3%) was devoted to social action and 346 million to operations (26.6%). Capital expenditures was just over 250 million euros (19.2%).

In 2010, the department was the third most indebted in France with €942 million of debt or 68.4% of the annual budget. This debt amounted to 2,460 euros per fiscal tax unit (household) and 859 euros per person. The trend of change in debt over the last decade has been a sharp increase: + 440% between 2001 and 2009 and 26% between 2009 and 2010. There was only €43 million in debt in 2003.

 Projects 
The Departmental Council of Alpes-Maritimes is currently sponsoring several large projects:
 construction of 10 residential facilities for the elderly
 building dikes in the Var plain
 creation of a STIC (science and information technology and communication) campus at Sophia Antipolis
 construction of 337 units of social housing
 establishment of facilities for the disabled
 road construction
 construction of schools and gyms (10)
 construction of a centre of sustainable development
 construction of the LGV Provence-Alpes-Côte d'Azur
 creation of the Eco Valley in the Plaine of the Var which will run from the Arena Quarter (which will be converted) to the village of Baus-Roux

The Alpes-Maritimes Departmental Council has charged 1 euro per vehicle journey in the department, regardless of distance, since 1 January 2008.

 Demographics 

When Nice became part of France in 1860, it was still a small town; the department had fewer than 200,000 inhabitants. However, the population grew quickly from 300,000 at the beginning of the 20th century to over a million. The population is aging because of the number of retirees who move to the coast.

The population is now concentrated in the urban region that includes Antibes, Cannes, Grasse, Nice, and Menton, and which constitutes 90% of the total population.

The department had 1,083,310 inhabitants in 2017, making it the 20th most populated department in France. There are 163 communes including 107 under 2000 inhabitants (representing a total of 60,065 inhabitants), 38 from 2000 to 9999 inhabitants (total 171,935 inhabitants), 13 between 10,000 and 49,999 inhabitants (total 263,102 inhabitants), 4 between 50,000 and 199,999 inhabitants (Antibes, Cannes, Cagnes-sur-Mer and Grasse, total 248,191 inhabitants), and one with over 200,000 inhabitants (Nice, with 340,017 inhabitants). The population density was 252 inhabitants per square kilometre in 2017.

According to INSEE 39.5% of children born in 2011 in the department of Alpes-Maritimes have at least one parent born abroad (regardless of nationality), 15.4% have a father born in North Africa.

The area is also known for its extremely large population of people of Italian descent. About 40% of the population of the Alpes-Maritimes claim their ancestry as being solely Italian, and as many as 80% of the population can trace some degree of ancestry back to Italy before it was annexed by France in the 1860s.

 Economy 
The economy of the Alpes-Maritimes is characterized by the importance of the tertiary sector. The department has, in addition to tourism and traditional services, a relatively high level of corporate research and higher level of services. Agriculture is of little importance and industry plays a relatively small role although it has diversified into activities with high technological value. The construction and public works sector is quite important. The economy is very sensitive to changes in the national and international situation. The rate of unemployment is 9.1%.

According to the INSEE, in 2005 the GDP per capita of the Alpes-Maritimes was 27,723 euros which ranked it as the thirteenth highest department in France. GDP was 29.6 billion euros. According to Eurostat, GDP per capita at market prices in 2008, the department had a GDP per capita of 30,700 euros, which is also ranked it thirteenth in France.

 Distribution of employment 

Tourism is an essential industry for the entire coastal region (Côte d'Azur) and is highly developed. On the coast, thanks to the mild climate, towns are resort destinations all year round. In the mountains, there are winter sports stations that have received abundant snow in recent years, particularly Isola 2000.

There are also well-developed industries such as the perfume industry in Grasse, new technologies from Sophia-Antipolis, and the aerospace industry in Cannes-Mandelieu, where there is the first European satellite builders and the first industrial plant dedicated to spacecraft manufacturing.

 Tourism 
 Seaside 

The presence of the Mediterranean Sea and the French Alps under a mild sky has favoured one dominant activity: tourism, which accounts for 64,000 jobs directly in the Alpes-Maritimes. For only the city of Nice the tourism turnover represents a 12 to 13% share of the whole tourism market in France. The capital of the Côte d'Azur is the fifth most populous city in France. The city of Nice also has the second largest airport in France (Nice Côte d'Azur Airport), after Paris and its three airports at Roissy, Orly and Le Bourget. There are nearly 13.5 million passengers per year passing through Nice Airport.

The seaside where the majority of the population resides is one of the most popular parts of the world with many attractions:
 Seaside resorts (Théoule-sur-Mer, Mandelieu-la-Napoule, Cannes, Golfe-Juan, Juan-les-Pins, Antibes, Cagnes-sur-Mer, Nice, Villefranche-sur-Mer, Beaulieu-sur-Mer, Èze-sur-Mer, Cap d'Ail, Roquebrune-Cap-Martin and Menton)
 Convention cities that spread their business throughout the year are Cannes, with its Palais des Festivals, and Nice, with its Acropolis.

The area inland from the busy French Riviera is an excellent base for many outdoor sports: cycling, mountain biking, skiing, walking, rock climbing, canyoning, canoeing, rafting, fishing, horse riding, Adventure parks, caving and the area has the first ever underground via ferrata. The area has internationally renowned paragliding and hang gliding flying sites at Col-de-Bleyne, Gourdon, Gréolières and Lachens.

 Mountainside 

In the mountains, skiing and hiking bring life to Saint-Étienne-de-Tinée (Auron), Beuil, Péone (Valberg), Saint-Martin-Vésubie, Isola, Gréolières, Peïra-Cava, Col de Turini, and Turini-Camp d'argent in the Authion mountains.

 Second homes 
As of 2019, 25.2% of available housing in the department were second homes.

 Culture 
Cultural life is rich and fully described in the daily regional Nice-Matin newspaper and announced in the weekly supplement JV Wednesday.

 Events 
 Cannes Film Festival, an annual film festival held in Cannes
 Marché du Film, held annually in conjunction with the Cannes Film Festival
 Midem, an annual trade fair for the music industry held in Cannes
 Cannes Lions International Festival of Creativity, an event of the advertising and creative communications industry

 Pantiero Festival, Cannes (electronic and independent music) in August
 International Dance Festival, Cannes, a dance festival held in late November and early December every second year
 International Festival of Games, Cannes, in February
 Festival of Night music at Le Suquet, Cannes, classical music in July
 Fireworks Festival, Cannes, fireworks in July and August
 Festival of Performances of actors, Cannes, June
 Festival of dances "Break the Floor", Cannes, January
 International Dance Festival, Cannes, November
 Festival of Russian Art and Dance, Cannes, August
 International Youth Ballets, organized by the Senior Dance School of École supérieure de danse de Cannes Rosella Hightower, Cannes, March
 La Fête du Mimosa, Mandelieu-la-Napoule, February
 Italian Market, Mougins, (formerly the Piedmontese Market before 2011)
 International Gastronomic festival, Mougins
 Jazz à Juan, Juan-les-Pins
 Nice Jazz Festival
 Nice Carnival
 Naval Combat with flowers, Villefranche-sur-Mer
 Lemon Festival, Menton
 Southern Nights in Vence, world music
 Festival Tomawok, Nice (rock, metal music), June
 Book Festival of Mouans-Sartoux, three days in early October (21st Festival in 2008)
 This Is Not Classic, an annual event for classical music, created by the General Council of the Alpes-Maritimes in 2005. It takes place at the Acropolis convention centre in Nice and occupies all available rooms beginning with the large auditorium seating 2,400 people.
 Chestnut Festival

 Museums 

Famous museums include:
 the Maeght Foundation in Saint-Paul-de-Vence
 the Picasso museum in Antibes
 Concrete art in Mouans-Sartoux
 the Fernand Léger Museum in Biot
 the Chagall and Matisse museums in Nice
 the Museum of Modern and Contemporary Art (MAMAC) also in Nice

 Education 

 Primary and secondary education 
The department has 222 nursery schools, 357 primary schools and one special school. It also hosts 72 colleges, 14 vocational schools and 22 high schools, to which must be added 65 private schools.

 Higher education 
The University of Nice Sophia Antipolis, in Nice and neighboring areas, was founded in 1965.

Higher education is relatively underdeveloped in the department. The urban area of Nice has 35,000 students, while Rennes and Bordeaux each have 60,000.

A campus of the Paris Institute of Political Studies (Sciences Po) was established in Menton in October 2005.  The Menton campus is dedicated to the relationship between the northern and southern shores of the Mediterranean and the relationship of Europe with the Middle East.

Several engineering schools are also located in Sophia Antipolis:
 Eurecom (School of Engineering and Research Center in communication systems)
 Mines ParisTech
 Polytech Nice Sophia

In addition, two major business schools are located in the region:
 EDHEC in Nice
 Skema Business School in Sophia Antipolis

There are is the French Institute for Research in Computer Science and Automation (INRIA) and the French National Centre for Scientific Research (CNRS) in Sophia Antipolis.

 Trivia 
The asteroid 100122 Alpes Maritimes is named in the department's honour, on the occasion of the thousandth discovery made from its territory.

 See also 
 Arrondissements of the Alpes-Maritimes department
 Cantons of the Alpes-Maritimes department
 Communes of the Alpes-Maritimes department

 Bibliography 
 The Heritage of the Communes of Alpes-Maritimes in two volumes, Flohic Éditions, collective work, volume I, Cantons of Antibes to Levens, January 2000, Paris, 504 pages, Jean-Luc Flohic .
 The Heritage of the Communes of Alpes-Maritimes in two volumes, Flohic Éditions, collective work, volume II, Cantons of Menton to Villefranche-sur-Mer, January 2000, Paris, 574 pages, Jean-Luc Flohic, p. 505 to 1079 .
 Rural Architecture of Alpes-Maritimes, Édisud, Philippe de Beauchamp, 1992, Aix-en-Provence, 140 pages, Photographer Loîc-Jahan .
 Religious Art in Alpes-Maritimes'', Édisud, Philippe de Beauchamp, 4th Quarter 1993, Aix-en-Provence, 144 pages, Photographer Loîc-Jahan .

References

External links 

 
 
  Prefecture website
  Departmental Council website
  Musical traditions in the Alpes-Maritimes department
  About.com 
 Archeo-alpi-maritimi 
 Alpes Maritimes, 1450–1550, Altar Pieces and Frescoes 

Alpes-Maritimes
1860 establishments in France
Departments of Provence-Alpes-Côte d'Azur
States and territories established in 1860